The 2022 ANZ Premiership season was the sixth season of Netball New Zealand's ANZ Premiership.  With a team coached by Yvette McCausland-Durie, co-captained by Kelly Jury and Tiana Metuarau and featuring Aliyah Dunn, Erikana Pedersen and Whitney Souness, Central Pulse won their third title. Pulse finished the regular season as minor premiers, finishing above Northern Stars and Northern Mystics. In the Elimination final, Stars defeated Mystics 63–57. Pulse then defeated Stars 56–37 in the Grand final.

Transfers

Notes
  Temalisi Fakahokotau initially signed for Central Pulse but in January 2022 announced she would be taking a break from netball. However she subsequently joined Saracens Mavericks as a replacement player for the 2022 Netball Superleague season.
  Katrina Rore initially signed for Waikato Bay of Plenty Magic but subsequently missed the season due a second pregnancy.

Head coaches and captains

Impact of COVID-19 pandemic

Matches cancelled
Just like the 2020 season, the 2022 season was impacted by the COVID-19 pandemic. Central Pulse were due to host the sixth edition of the official ANZ Premiership tournament at Te Wānanga o Raukawa in Otaki between 24 and 27 February. However, the tournament was cancelled after a change in COVID-19 alert levels. Pulse's Round 1 match against Northern Stars was cancelled following a Covid-19 outbreak in their squad. Their head coach Yvette McCausland-Durie also tested positive for Covid-19. Further matches were cancelled throughout the season, most notably in early April when six matches were cancelled across Rounds 4 and 5. Some cancelled matches were simply rescheduled and added to later rounds. However, the backlog of cancelled matches effectively created a Round 13.

Player pool
In order to reduce the number of cancelled matches, the ANZ Premiership created a free agent player pool that teams could use to recruit temporary replacements. Greer Sinclair subsequently played for four teams during the season. As well as played for Northern Comets in the National Netball League, she also played for Northern Stars, Northern Mystics and Waikato Bay of Plenty Magic in the ANZ Premiership. Another member of the pool, Storm Purvis came out of retirement to play for Stars. This saw her make her 100th senior league appearance.

Regular season

Round 1

Round 2

Round 3

Round 4

Round 5

Round 6

 

Rescheduled Round 4 match

Round 7

Round 8

Round 9

Round 10

Round 11

Round 12

Round 13
Originally only twelve rounds of matches were scheduled. However, the backlog of cancelled matches effectively created a Round 13.
Rescheduled matches

 

Notes
  Matches postponed under the ANZ Premiership's Covid-19 Match Postponement Policy.

Final standings

Finals series

Elimination final

Grand final

Awards

New Zealand Netball Awards 

Notes
  Grace Nweke and Kelly Jury shared Dame Lois Muir Supreme Award.

ANZ Premiership Awards

Team of the season
Brendon Egan selected Stuff's team of the season. 

Stuff Super Seven 

Bench

References

 
2022
2022 in New Zealand netball
Sports events affected by the COVID-19 pandemic